Rzęśnica may refer to:
 Rzęśnica, Drawsko County
 Rzęśnica, Goleniów County